Kimmy Dora is a Filipino comedy film series originally produced by Spring Films, co-produced and distributed by Star Cinema and Solar Films. The film stars mainly Eugene Domingo, Ariel Ureta, Moi Bien, Miriam Quiambao, and Mura. The leading actors of Eugene Domingo is Dingdong Dantes and Zanjoe Marudo for the first two films and Sam Milby for the final installment of the film. The series has grossed over  worldwide (not including the last film). The first film installment, Kimmy Dora: Kambal sa Kiyeme, was released on September 2, 2009. The second installment, Kimmy Dora and the Temple of Kiyeme, was released on June 13, 2013.

Films

Kimmy Dora: Kambal sa Kiyeme (2009)

Kimmy Dora and the Temple of Kiyeme (2012)

Kimmy Dora: Ang Kiyemeng Prequel (2013)

References

External links

Philippine films by series
Tagalog-language films
English-language films
Star Cinema films
Spring Films films
Philippine comedy films
Films directed by Joyce Bernal
Films directed by Chris Martinez